Monostoecha is a monotypic moth genus in the family Geometridae described by David Stephen Fletcher in 1979. Its only species, Monostoecha semipectinata, first described by George Duryea Hulst in 1898, is found in the American Southwest.

References

Geometridae
Monotypic moth genera